Billow or billows may refer to:

Wave
Wind wave
Billow maidens, Norse mythological wave maidens
Andrew Billow (1924–2003), American politician
Richard Billows, American academic

See also

Bellows (disambiguation)
, a ship